Chiahpui is a village in the Champhai district of Mizoram, India. It is located in the Ngopa R.D. Block.

Demographics 

According to the 2011 census of India, Chiahpui has 167 households. The effective literacy rate (i.e. the literacy rate of population excluding children aged 6 and below) is 93.91%.

References 

Villages in Ngopa block